Amal Saad Eddin is a Palestinian Syrian television artist, voice artist and director.

Early life
Saad Eddin was born in Latakia to a Palestinian family. She is married to the artist Qasim Melho.
She worked as a broadcaster in the role of Conan in the television program Conan on the Air.

Appearances

TV series
 Fire shaft
 Champion of this decade
 The hotel
 episodes of spot light series

Broadcasting
 The rule of justice

Movies
 Spirit breeze
 The Jasmine Birds (credited as Amal Saad Al-Deen)

Dubbing roles
 Detective Conan – Conan Edogawa
 Detective Conan: The Time-Bombed Skyscraper – Conan Edogawa
 Detective Conan: The Fourteenth Target – Conan Edogawa
 Detective Conan: The Last Wizard of the Century – Conan Edogawa
 Detective Conan: Captured in Her Eyes – Conan Edogawa
 Detective Conan: Zero the Enforcer – Conan Edogawa
 Detective Conan: The Fist of Blue Sapphire – Conan Edogawa
 Bomberman B-Daman Bakugaiden
 The Sylvester & Tweety Mysteries – Granny (Venus Centre version)
 Pokémon – Nurse Joy
 Fist of the North Star
 Ranma ½ – Reem (Akane Tendo)
 Muka Muka Paradise
 Doraemon (1979 anime) – Doraemon
 One Piece – Nojiko, Kuina
 Pippi Longstocking – Pippi Longstocking
 Bakugan Battle Brawlers – Nene
 Midori no Makibaō – Midori Makibaō (Venus Centre version)
 Adventures of Sonic the Hedgehog – Qanfooz (Sonic the Hedgehog) (Venus Centre version)
 Pretty Rhythm - Itsuki Harune

References

Living people
Syrian television actresses
People from Latakia
20th-century Syrian actresses
21st-century Syrian actresses
Syrian stage actresses
Syrian radio actresses
Syrian film actresses
Syrian voice actresses
Syrian television presenters
Syrian people of Palestinian descent
Year of birth missing (living people)